William Augustus Norton (October 25, 1810 – September 21, 1883) was a civil engineer and educator. He was the president of Delaware College and later a founding faculty member of the Sheffield Scientific School at Yale University

Norton was born in East Bloomfield, New York. Norton graduated from the United States Military Academy at West Point, New York in 1831 and began his academic career there as assistant professor of natural and experimental philosophy. During this time, he also participated in the Black Hawk War.  In 1833, he became professor of natural philosophy and astronomy at the University of the City of New York.  In 1839, he moved to Delaware College as professor and then in 1850, became president.  He had planned to turn the school into a scientific institution but was discouraged and left in 1850, to become professor of natural philosophy and civil engineering at Brown University.  He was elected to the American Philosophical Society in 1844. In 1852, Norton moved to Yale College with his students to become the school's first professor of engineering, and became one of the founding faculty of the Sheffield Scientific School when it was founded in 1854. In 1873, he became a member of the National Academy of Sciences.  He remained at Yale until his death in 1883.

While at the University of the City of New York, Norton completed a college astronomy textbook known as An Elementary Treatise on Astronomy (Wiley & Putnam, 1839), which was re-issued in four editions. He was also the author of the First Book of Natural Philosophy and Astronomy (1858).

Publications

Textbooks

Journal articles

References

Further reading

External links
 

1810 births
Members of the United States National Academy of Sciences
1883 deaths
Yale School of Engineering & Applied Science
American civil engineers
United States Military Academy alumni
City University of New York faculty
Presidents of the University of Delaware
American military personnel of the Indian Wars
United States Army officers
People from East Bloomfield, New York
Sheffield Scientific School faculty
Brown University faculty
Engineers from New York (state)
American people of the Black Hawk War
Military personnel from New York (state)